Pimisi is a light rail station on the Ottawa Confederation Line as part of the O-Train network.

Location

The stop is located under Booth Street in LeBreton Flats. and opened on September 14, 2019. It serves the redeveloped flats area, including the New Central Library, Chinatown, and Little Italy.

History

The Transitway station was originally named LeBreton. By proposal of the local Algonquin leaders it was renamed "Pimisi" (Algonquin: eel) when it was rebuilt to accommodate the O-Train.

Layout

The station features an island platform located at grade. Unusually, the platform level is an intermediate level. Above it, two entrance buildings with entrance barriers are located on either side of Booth Street. Below the platform, a concourse with its own ticket barrier gives access to the green space and plaza north of the station and to Albert Street.

The station features several artworks by Algonquin artists. Nadia Myre's work Eel Spirit, Basket, and Fence is a trilogy consisting of two sculptures (the eel and basket) located in the plaza north of the station, and a series of forest designs on the glass platform walls. The sculpture Algonquin Moose by Simon Brascoupé is also located in the plaza, while another work by him, Algonquin Birch Bark Biting Designs, is located on the glass wall of the entrance on the west side of Booth Street. Finally, Màmawi: Together is a work featuring 100 wooden paddles painted by four Algonquin artists mentored by Brascoupé—Emily Brascoupé-Hoefler, Doreen Stevens, Sherry-Ann Rodgers, and Sylvia Tennisco—as well as Algonquin community members who participated in workshops led by these artists. It is suspended above the platform.

Service

The following routes serve Pimisi station as of October 6, 2019:

References

Confederation Line stations
Railway stations in Canada opened in 2019
1983 establishments in Ontario
2019 establishments in Ontario